In enzymology, a pyrogallol hydroxytransferase is an enzyme that catalyzes the chemical reaction

1,2,3,5-tetrahydroxybenzene + 1,2,3-trihydroxybenzene  1,3,5-trihydroxybenzene + 1,2,3,5-tetrahydroxybenzene

Thus, the two substrates of this enzyme are 1,2,3,5-tetrahydroxybenzene and 1,2,3-trihydroxybenzene (pyrogallol), whereas its two products are 1,3,5-trihydroxybenzene (phloroglucinol) and 1,2,3,5-tetrahydroxybenzene.

This enzyme participates in benzoic acid degradation via CoA ligation.

Nomenclature 

This enzyme belongs to the family of oxidoreductases.  The systematic name of this enzyme class is 1,2,3,5-tetrahydroxybenzene:1,2,3-trihydroxybenzene hydroxytransferase. Other names in common use include 1,2,3,5-tetrahydroxybenzene hydroxyltransferase, 1,2,3,5-tetrahydroxybenzene:pyrogallol transhydroxylase, 1,2,3,5-tetrahydroxybenzene-pyrogallol hydroxyltransferase (transhydroxylase), pyrogallol hydroxyltransferase, 1,2,3,5-tetrahydroxybenzene:1,2,3-trihydroxybenzene hydroxyltransferase.

References 

 

EC 1.97.1
Enzymes of known structure